Saabolda is a village in Setomaa Parish, Võru County in southeastern Estonia.

Saabolda and its neighbouring villages (Kundruse, Litvina, Pattina, Perdaku, Saatse, Samarina, Sesniki and Ulitina) are notable as part of Estonia that although not an enclave, before 2008 wasn't reachable by road without passing through Russian territory for several hundred metres, through an area known as the Saatse Boot. In 2008 a new Matsuri–Sesniki road was opened, making it possible to reach the area without necessarily passing through the Saatse Boot. This is however a 15–20 km detour if going from Värska.

References

 
Villages in Võru County